Ya-Asana is a small Fijian island.

References

Islands of Fiji